The 'Rafflesia Forest Reserve is a Virgin Jungle Reserve (VJR) that covers an area of 356 ha of Tambunan District, Sabah, Malaysia. The forest was first established in 1967 as part of the Crocker Range Forest Reserve. In 1984, it was re-established by the Sabah Forestry Department to protect the Rafflesia flowers abundant in the area.

The Rafflesia Information Centre, located directly along the road from Kota Kinabalu to Tambunan, is the main tourist target within the reserve. Several sites of Rafflesia pricei are reachable from the centre on hiking trails.

Access

The Rafflesia Information Centre is located between Kota Kinabalu and Tambunan, off Federal Route 500. The Rafflesia plants are located on the mountainside and two hours of hiking are required to see them. The Kipandi Butterfly Park is accessible from the road to the information centre.

References
"Rafflesia Forest Reserve: Conserving not only Rafflesia but also Endemic, Rare and Interesting Insects" . Sabah Forestry Department.

External links

1984 establishments in Malaysia
Tourism in Malaysia
Forestry in Malaysia
Forest reserves of Sabah
Borneo montane rain forests